Sukhaya Rossosh is a rural locality (a khutor) in Beryozovskoye Rural Settlement, Podgorensky District, Voronezh Oblast, Russia. The population was 211 as of 2010. There are 2 streets.

Geography 
Sukhaya Rossosh is located 35 km north of Podgorensky (the district's administrative centre) by road. Beryozovo is the nearest rural locality.

References 

Rural localities in Podgorensky District